The Rochester Public Library is a library in Rochester, Minnesota.  It is a member of Southeastern Libraries Cooperating, the southeast Minnesota library region. It is the largest public library in an 11-county consortium.

National Medal 
In May 2018, Rochester Public Library was given the National Medal for Museum and Library Service, the highest honor for institutions that make significant and exceptional contributions to their communities.  It was one of only five libraries nationally to receive this distinction.

History 
In 1895, the Rochester Public Library was officially established, led by local attorney Burt W. Eaton. A local library society was confirmed by the city council on April 29, 1895. The library was first set up in the City Hall building, and by the end of that year it contained 10,744 volumes (according to its first-ever Annual Report). In 1966, a bookmobile service was created, holding 5,000 volumes at a cost of about $22,000. The current Library location opened on October 4, 1995.

The library routinely organize several events for the public which routinely includes Book Club, Origami club, Writers Club, Movie night, several art classes for the kids.

Bike Share Program 

Rochester Public Library offers Bike share program for its members and visitors to borrow the bike for a day or week. In 2019, RPL has also started electric cargo bike under the program from 2019.

References

External links 
 Official Website
 Rochester Public Library on Google Cultural Institute
 Online Library Catalog
 Southeastern Libraries Cooperating

Southeastern Libraries Cooperating
Buildings and structures in Rochester, Minnesota
Education in Olmsted County, Minnesota
1895 establishments in Minnesota
Library buildings completed in 1995